Linstead is a town in Jamaica.

Linstead may also refer to:
Linstead Magna, Suffolk, England
Linstead Parva, Suffolk, England
Lynsted, Kent, England

People
 George Linstead (1908-1974), British composer and music critic
Hugh Linstead (1901–1987), British pharmaceutical chemist, barrister, and politician
Patrick Linstead (1902–1966), British chemist